Estonian Restoration of Independence, legally defined as the Restoration of the  Republic of Estonia, was proclaimed on 20 August 1991. On that day at 23:02 local time, the Supreme Council of the Republic of Estonia, in agreement with the Estonian Committee (the executive organ of the Congress of Estonia), declared the illegal Soviet occupation and annexation of the country terminated, and proclaimed the full restoration of the independence of Estonia.

Background

Estonia declared neutrality at the outbreak of World War II, but the independent country was repeatedly contested, invaded and occupied, first by Stalinist Soviet Union in 1940, then by Nazi Germany in 1941, and ultimately reoccupied in 1944 by the Soviet Union again. Soviet-occupied Estonia was annexed into the USSR as an administrative subunit (Estonian SSR). Throughout the 1944–1991 Soviet occupation, Estonia's de jure state continuity was preserved by diplomatic representatives and the government-in-exile. Following the bloodless Estonian "Singing Revolution" of 1988–1990, the nation's de facto full independence was restored at the same time with the Soviet coup d'état attempt in Moscow on 20 August 1991.

On 30 March 1990, the Supreme Soviet of the Estonian SSR had adopted a resolution on the state status of Estonia. The parliament which had just been elected (in the first relatively free elections during the period of 1944–1991 Soviet control) declared that the occupation of the Republic of Estonia by the Soviet Union on 17 June 1940 did not de jure interrupt the existence of the Republic of Estonia, The Supreme Soviet declared the state power of the Estonian SSR illegal from the moment of its establishment and proclaimed the beginning of the restoration of the Republic of Estonia. A transitional period was announced until the formation of the constitutional bodies of state power of the Republic of Estonia. It was also announced that relations between Estonia and the USSR were from then on based on the Tartu Peace Treaty, concluded between the Republic of Estonia and the RSFSR on 2 February 1920.

The August Coup or the "August Putsch" took place on 19–22 August 1991 and was an attempt by some members of the former Soviet Union's government to take control of the country from the then Soviet President and General Secretary Mikhail Gorbachev. As the coup attempt was taking place in Moscow and with that the military and political attention of the Soviet Union otherwise occupied, the parliaments in Soviet-occupied Estonia and Latvia took the opportunity to declare the restoration of full independence of their respective countries. On the evening of 19 August, leaders of the country's two freely elected parliaments — the Supreme Council of Estonia and the Congress of Estonia – started negotiations upon how to confirm the restoration of independence of the Republic of Estonia. It was decided that Estonia would not declare independence as some kind of a "new republic" and that, by popular demand, the country will remain legally a continuation of the Republic of Estonia, a sovereign state that was established in 1918 and did not cease to exist during the 1940–1991 military occupations by foreign powers.

20 August 1991

At 23:02 on the evening of 20 August 1991, during a live broadcast carried out by Estonian Television, the Supreme Council of the Republic of Estonia voted on the confirm of its Restoration of Independence. 

Out of the 105 delegates of the Supreme Council 70 were present, 69 voted in favour of the restoration. Two delegates, Klavdia Sergij and Kaido Kama, did not register to vote and walked out before voting began. Those who voted in favour of the restoration were:

 Ülle Aaskivi
 Mati Ahven
 Andres Ammas
 Tõnu Anton
 Uno Anton
 Lembit Arro
 Hillar Eller
 Kaljo Ellik
 Ignar Fjuk
 Illar Hallaste
 Liia Hänni
 Arvo Junti
 Jaak Jõerüüt
 Rein Järlik
 Ants Järvesaar
 Villu Jürjo
 Hillar Kalda
 Teet Kallas
 Peet Kask
 Johannes Kass
 Kalju Koha
 Valeri Kois
 Mai Kolossova
 Jüri Kork
 Toomas Kork
 Heino Kostabi
 Ahti Kõo
 Tiit Käbin
 Ants Käärma
 Mart Laar
 Marju Lauristin
 Enn Leisson
 Jüri Liim
 Jaan Lippmaa
 Alar Maarend
 Tiit Made
 Mart Madissoon
 Tõnis Mets
 Aavo Mölder
 Ülo Nugis
 Ants Paju
 Eldur Parder
 Heldur Peterson
 Andrei Prii
 Priidu Priks
 Jüri E. Põld
 Enn Põldroos
 Koit Raud
 Jüri Reinson
 Andrus Ristkok
 Jüri Rätsep
 Arnold Rüütel
 Tõnu Saarman
 Edgar Savisaar
 Hanno Schotter
 Lehte Sööt
 Aldo Tamm
 Rein Tamme
 Andres Tarand
 Indrek Toome
 Enn Tupp
 Ain Tähiste
 Uno Ugandi
 Ülo Uluots
 Heinrich Valk
 Ants Veetõusme
 Rein Veidemann
 Helgi Viirelaid
 Vaino Väljas

Aftermath

On the morning of 21 August 1991, Soviet paratroopers were taking charge of the Tallinn’s TV tower, while the television broadcast was cut off for a while, the radio signal was strong as a handful of Estonian Defence League (the unified paramilitary armed forces of Estonia) members barricaded the entry into signal rooms.
By the afternoon of the same day it was clear that the coup in Moscow had failed and the paratroopers released the tower and left Estonia soon afterwards.

In 1994, the 20 August Club was established. The club's members are those politicians who voted in favour of the restoration on 20 August 1991.

See also
State continuity of the Baltic states
Dissolution of the Soviet Union

References

Law of Estonia
1991 in Estonia
Singing Revolution
1991 in the Soviet Union
August 1991 events in Europe
1991 documents